Étienne Mendy (born 14 June 1969 in Saint-Quentin, Aisne, France) is a French former professional footballer who played 174 times in Ligue 1 and 114 times in Ligue 2. Mendy played for Nîmes, Caen, Sochaux, Saint Etienne and Beauvais between 1985 and 1999.

Following his retirement as a player Mendy became an agent for other players.

References

1969 births
Living people
French footballers
French sportspeople of Senegalese descent
Association football forwards
AS Beauvais Oise players
AS Saint-Étienne players
FC Sochaux-Montbéliard players
Stade Malherbe Caen players
Nîmes Olympique players
Ligue 1 players
Ligue 2 players
People from Saint-Quentin, Aisne
Sportspeople from Aisne
Footballers from Hauts-de-France